Tamaar Padaar is a 2014 Indian Malayalam-language satirical comedy film written and directed by Dileesh Nair and produced by M. Renjith through the company Rejaputhra Visual Media. It stars Prithviraj Sukumaran, Baburaj, and Chemban Vinod Jose. The film's soundtrack was composed by Bijibal. The film was released on 23 October 2014 on the occasion of Diwali.

Plot 

Jumper Thambi and Tubelight Mani are street performers. Jumper Thambi does stunts like bike Jumping and Tubelight Mani does stunts with Tubelight. They do not know each other in the beginning but once they meet each other at a Temple festival, they instantly becomes good friends. Once they decide to do a stunt together for media visibility. They both tried to squeeze-in through a bicycle tube but ends up getting stuck.

ACP Pouran, whose main intention is to stand out among his colleagues misunderstands. While Jumper Thambi and Tubelight Mani are struggling to get out of the bicycle tube, ACP happens to see them by accident. ACP finds resemblance between Jumber Thambi and a notorious terrorist. He arrests them both and puts them in trial. The ruling party takes undue advantage of this situation by taking all credits and meanwhile all international anti-terrorist organizations also wants to get these two in custody.

ACP Pauran later understands the truth and now wants them released at all cost. He tries the legal way but gets no help from his superior officers. Finally the duo is sentenced to death penalty. ACP Pauran helps them escape by faking proof that they were hanged. In the end we see both Jumper Thambi and Tubelight Mani living in an unknown place with a bearded look away from their old lives and means.

Cast 
 Baburaj as Jumper Thambi and Terrorist (Dual role)
 Chemban Vinod Jose as Tubelight Mani
 Prithviraj Sukumaran as ACP Pouran
 Srinda Ashab as Valsamma
 Vijay Babu as Purushan
 Ashvin Mathew as Minister John Katuparamban
 Manju Sunichen as Kanakam
 Shammi Thilakan as Kumaran
 Jojet John
 Anjali Aneesh as Vanitha, Purushan's wife
 Dhaneeh as Iddaly kallan
 Dileesh Pothan as Siby karimannoor
 Parvathi T. as Sandya Sumesh
 Jino John

Production
The film marks the directorial debut of screenwriter Dileesh Nair who also wrote the film's screenplay. The film was produced by M. Renjith. The role of Jumper Thampi was earlier offered to Biju Menon. Vijay Babu appears in the flashback scenes as Purushan, Pouran's father. Filming began in Sabarimala in April 2014. It was also filmed in Thiruvananthapuram. The title Tamaar Padaar is an onomatopoeia word in Malayalam that refers to the sound of a blast in comics.

Reception 
The film was released on 3 October 2014. It mostly received negative response from critics.

References 

2010s Malayalam-language films
Indian comedy films
Indian satirical films
2014 comedy films
2014 films
Films shot in Thiruvananthapuram
Films shot in Kollam
2010s satirical films